Agnolo (Angelo) Ambrogini (14 July 1454 – 24 September 1494), commonly known by his nickname Poliziano (anglicized as Politian; Latin:  Politianus), was an Italian classical scholar and poet of the Florentine Renaissance. His scholarship was instrumental in the divergence of Renaissance (or Humanist) Latin from medieval norms and for developments in philology. His nickname, Poliziano, by which he is chiefly identified to the present day, was derived from the Latin name of his birthplace, Montepulciano (Mons Politianus).

Poliziano's works include translations of passages from Homer's Iliad, an edition of the poetry of Catullus and commentaries on classical authors and literature. It was his classical scholarship that brought him the attention of the wealthy and powerful Medici family that ruled Florence. He served the Medici as a tutor to their children, and later as a close friend and political confidant. His later poetry, including La Giostra, glorified his patrons.

He used his didactic poem Manto, written in the 1480s, as an introduction to his lectures on Virgil.

Biography

Early life
Poliziano was born as Angelo Ambrogini in Montepulciano, in central Tuscany in 1454. His father Benedetto, a jurist of good family and distinguished ability, was murdered by political antagonists for adopting the cause of Piero de' Medici in Montepulciano; this circumstance gave his eldest son, Angelo, a claim on the House of Medici.

At the age of ten, after the premature death of his father, Poliziano began his studies at Florence, as the guest of a cousin. There he learned the classical languages of Latin and Greek. From Marsilio Ficino he learned the rudiments of philosophy. At 13 he began to circulate Latin letters; at 17 he wrote essays in Greek versification; and at 18 he published an edition of Catullus. In 1470 he won the title of homericus adulescens by translating books II-V of the Iliad into Latin hexameters. Lorenzo de' Medici, the autocrat of Florence and the chief patron of learning in Italy at the time, took Poliziano into his household, made him the tutor of his children, among which were Piero the Unfortunate and Giovanni, the future Pope Leo X. The humanistic content of his lessons brought him into constant conflict with their mother, Clarice. Lorenzo also secured him a distinguished post at the University of Florence. During this time, Poliziano lectured at the Platonic Academy under the leadership of Marsilio Ficino, at the Careggi Villa.

Adulthood and teaching

Among Poliziano's pupils could be numbered the chief students of Europe, the men who were destined to carry to their homes the spolia opima of Italian culture. He also educated students from Germany, England and Portugal.

It was the method of professors at that period to read the Greek and Latin authors with their class, dictating philological and critical notes, emending corrupt passages in the received texts, offering elucidations of the matter, and teaching laws, manners, religious and philosophical opinions of the ancients. Poliziano covered nearly the whole ground of classical literature during his tenure, and published the notes of his courses upon Ovid, Suetonius, Statius, Pliny the Younger, and Quintilian. He also undertook a recension of the text of Justinian II's Digest and lectured about it. This recension influenced the Roman code.

Proposal to King John II of Portugal

Poliziano wrote a letter to John II of Portugal paying him a profound homage:

to render you thanks on behalf of all who belong to this century, which now favours of your quasi-divine merits, now boldly competing with ancient centuries and all Antiquity.

and considering his achievements to be of merit above Alexander the Great or Julius Caesar. He offered himself to write an epic work giving an account of John II's accomplishments in navigation and conquests. The king replied in a positive manner, in a letter of October 23, 1491, but delayed the commission. The epic work regarding Portuguese discoveries was only written almost one hundred years later by Luís de Camões.

Final years

Poliziano spent his final years without financial or other worries, studying philosophy. Piero the Unfortunate even asked Pope Alexander VI to make him a cardinal.

It is likely that Poliziano was homosexual, or at least had male lovers, and he never married. Evidence includes denunciations of sodomy made to the Florentine authorities, poems and letters of contemporaries, allusions within his work (most notably the Orfeo) and the circumstances of his death. The last suggests he was killed by a fever (possibly resulting from syphilis) which was exacerbated by standing under the windowsill of a boy he was infatuated with despite being ill. He may also have been a lover of Pico della Mirandola.

But it is just as likely that his death was precipitated by the loss of his friend and patron Lorenzo de' Medici in April 1492, Poliziano himself dying on 24 September 1494, just before the foreign invasion gathering in France swept over Italy.

In 2007, the bodies of Poliziano and Pico della Mirandola were exhumed from the Church of San Marco in Florence to establish the causes of their deaths. Forensic tests showed that both Poliziano and Pico likely died of arsenic poisoning, possibly the order of Lorenzo's successor, Piero de' Medici.

Legacy

Poliziano was well known as a scholar, a professor, a critic, and a Latin poet in an age when the classics were still studied with assimilative curiosity, and not with the scientific industry of a later period. He was the representative of that age of scholarship in which students drew their ideal of life from antiquity. He was also known as an Italian poet, a contemporary of Ariosto.

At the same time he was busy as a translator from the Greek. His versions of Epictetus, Hippocrates, Galen, Plutarch's Eroticus and Plato's Charmides distinguished him as a writer. Of these learned labors, the most universally acceptable to the public of that time were a series of discursive essays on philology and criticism, first published in 1489 under the title of Miscellanea. They had an immediate and lasting effect, influencing the scholars of the next century.

Anthony Grafton writes that Poliziano's "conscious adoption of a new standard of accuracy and precision" enabled him "to prove that his scholarship was something new, something distinctly better than that of the previous generation":By treating the study of antiquity as completely irrelevant to civic life and by suggesting that in any case only a tiny elite could study the ancient world with adequate rigor, Poliziano departed from the tradition of classical studies in Florence. Earlier Florentine humanists had studied the ancient world in order to become better men and citizens. Poliziano by contrast insisted above all on the need to understand the past in the light of every possibly relevant bit of evidence — and to scrap any belief about the past that did not rest on firm documentary foundations ... [But] when he set ancient works back into their historical context Poliziano eliminated whatever contemporary relevance they might have had.

Works

His Latin and Greek works include:
 the poem Manto, in which he pronounced a panegyric of Virgil;
 the Ambra, which contains an idyllic sketch of Tuscan landscape and a eulogy of Homer;
 the Rusticus, which celebrated country life;
 the Nutricia, which was intended to serve as a general introduction to the study of ancient and modern poetry.

His principal Italian works are:
 his most highly regarded work in Italian, Stanze per la giostra, or La Giostra, written upon Giuliano de' Medici's victory in a tournament in 1475. This work was left unfinished following the 1478 Pazzi conspiracy, which resulted in the assassination of its protagonist. In addition, Lorenzo's wife Clarice strongly disapproved of the humanistic nature of the poem, causing Politian to resign, leave Florence in 1479 and settle in Mantua, where he set to work on the Fabula di Orfeo.
 the Orfeo, a lyrical drama performed at Mantua with musical accompaniment;
 a collection of Tuscan songs, reproducing various forms of popular poetry distinguished by a roseate fluency.

His philosophical works are:
 Praelectio de dialectica (1491), an introduction to Aristotelian logic;
 Lamia. Praelectio in Priora Aristotelis Analytica (1492);
 Dialectica (1493), an introduction to a course on Aristotelian philosophy.

English translations

Notes

References

Further reading
 
 
 
 
 
 
 
 
 
 
 
 
 
 
 
 
 •	A new beginning. Poliziano’s Panepistemon, in Renaissance Encyclopaedism: Studies in Curiosity and Ambition, ed. by W. S Blanchard – A. Severi, Centre for Reformation and Renissance studies - Victoria University of Toronto, 2018, pp. 249-277

External links

 

1454 births
1494 deaths
People from Montepulciano
Medieval LGBT people
Italian gay writers
Gay poets
Italian LGBT poets
Italian Renaissance humanists
Italian poets
Italian male poets
New Latin-language poets
15th-century Latin writers
Greek–Latin translators
15th-century Italian poets
15th-century translators
Translators of Homer
Italian Renaissance writers